3-oxoacid CoA-transferase 1 (OXCT1) is an enzyme that in humans is encoded by the OXCT1 gene. It is also known as succinyl-CoA-3-oxaloacid CoA transferase (SCOT). Mutations in the OXCT1 gene are associated with succinyl-CoA:3-oxoacid CoA transferase deficiency. This gene encodes a member of the 3-oxoacid CoA-transferase gene family. The encoded protein is a homodimeric mitochondrial matrix enzyme that plays a central role in extrahepatic ketone body catabolism by catalyzing the reversible transfer of coenzyme A (CoA) from succinyl-CoA to acetoacetate.

Structure

Gene 
The OXCT1 gene resides on chromosome 5 at the band 5p13. OXCT1 spans a length of over 100 kb and includes 17 exons.

Protein 
The crystal structure of human OXCT1 reveals it to be a homodimer with two active sites. Each of its monomers contains N- and C-terminal domains that share an α/β structural fold characteristic of CoA transferase family I members. These terminal domains are joined by a linker region and form the enzyme's active site. Specifically, the conserved residue Glu344 within the active site is responsible for the enzyme's catalytic function by attacking the succinyl-CoA substrate, leading to the formation of the enzyme-CoA thioester intermediate.

Function 
OXCT1 is a member of the CoA transferase family I, which is known to catalyze the transfer of CoA between carboxylic acid groups. In particular, OXCT1 catalyzes the first, rate-limiting step in ketolysis by transferring the CoA from succinyl-CoA to acetoacetate, giving acetoacetyl-CoA (AcAc-CoA). The product AcAc-CoA can then be converted by acetoacetyl-CoA thiolase into acetyl-CoA, which enters the citric acid cycle to generate energy for the cell. As a result, OXCT1 allows cells to utilize energy stored in ketone bodies synthesized by the liver during conditions of energy deficiency, such as low glucose levels. In addition, OXCT1 activity leads to the formation of Acetyl-CoA, which serves as a precursor for short-chain acyl-CoAs and lipids in the cytosol. 

OXCT1 is found in the mitochondrial matrix of all tissues except the liver, though it is most abundantly expressed in heart, brain, and kidney tissue. Considering that liver cells function in ketogenesis and OXCT1 in ketolysis, OXCT1 may be absent from the liver to allow ketone body formation to proceed.

Clinical Significance

Metabolic disorders 
SCOT deficiency is a rare autosomal recessive metabolic disorder that can lead to recurrent episodes of ketoacidosis and even permanent ketosis. Twenty-four mutations in the human OXCT1 gene have been identified and associated with SCOT deficiency: three nonsense mutations, two insertion mutations, and 19 missense mutations. These mutations alter OXCT1 form and thus function in various ways, and they determine what phenotypic complications a patient may present. For instance, several missense mutations that substitute bulkier or charged residues hinder proper folding of OXCT1, leading to more severe outcomes such as permanent acidosis. 

OXCT1 has also been implicated diabetes. In a study by MacDonald et al., OXCT1 activity was shown to be lower by 92% in pancreatic islets of human patients with type 2 diabetes compared to those in healthy patients, though the cause is currently unknown.

Cancer 
Since OXCT1 functions in metabolizing ketone bodies, it has been proposed to promote tumor growth by providing tumor cells with an additional energy source. Therefore, ketone inhibitors may prove effective in treating patients experiencing recurring and metastatic tumors. A proteomics study identified OXCT1 to be one of 16 proteins upregulated in carcinoma HepG2 cells treated with Platycodin D, an anti-cancer agent.

See also 
 Succinyl-CoA:3-oxoacid CoA transferase deficiency

References

Further reading